The 1983 Coupe de France Final was a football match held at Parc des Princes, Paris on 11 June 1983. Paris Saint-Germain FC defeated FC Nantes 3–2 thanks to goals by Pascal Zaremba, Safet Sušić and Nabatingue Toko.

Match details

In popular culture
In the romantic comedy Le Fabuleux Destin d'Amélie Poulain, the title character avenges a trick by interfering with a man's viewing of this match on his television set. This sequence occurs approximately eight minutes into the film.

See also
Coupe de France 1982-83

References

External links
Coupe de France results at Rec.Sport.Soccer Statistics Foundation
Report on French federation site

Coupe
1983
Coupe De France Final 1983
Coupe De France Final 1983
Coupe De France Final
Coupe De France Final